The 1914 SAFL Grand Final was an Australian rules football competition. Port Adelaide beat North Adelaide by a margin of 79 points (93 to 14).

Teams 
Teams were announced the morning of the match.

Scorecard

References 

SANFL Grand Finals
Grand